Sam'alil is a village in northern Syria, administratively part of the Homs District, located north of Homs. According to the Syria Central Bureau of Statistics (CBS), Sam'alil had a population of 1,017 in the 2004 census. Its inhabitants are predominantly Sunni Muslims of Turkmen descent.

References

Populated places in Homs District

Turkmen communities in Syria